St. Nicholas' Monastery Church is a monastery church in Dhivër, Vlorë County, Albania. It is a Cultural Monument of Albania.

References

Cultural Monuments of Albania
Buildings and structures in Finiq
Churches in Vlorë County
Dhivër